Hartaj Bains (born 2 June 1979) is a former Kenyan male squash player. He is also the younger brother of fellow Kenyan squash player, Rajdeep Bains. Hartaj Bains and his brother, Rajdeep Bains also competed together for the Kenyan squash team at the 2007 Men's World Team Squash Championships.

He also represented Kenya at the 2014 Commonwealth Games and competed in the  men's singles event.

References 

1979 births
Living people
Kenyan male squash players
Squash players at the 2014 Commonwealth Games
Commonwealth Games competitors for Kenya
Sportspeople from Nairobi